Girolamo Simoncelli (1522, Orvieto, then in the Papal States – 24 February 1605, Rome) was an Italian cardinal.

Life
Simoncelli was made a cardinal by his great-uncle, Pope Julius III, in the consistory of 22 December 1553.  He was elected bishop of Orvieto in 1554 and administrator in 1570. He took part in the two conclaves in April and May 1555, those in 1559 and 1565–66, the two in September and October–December 1590, and those in 1591 and 1592. He was cardinal protopriest from 1598 onwards and vice-dean of the College of Cardinals from 1603.

The Prophecy of the Popes was possibly forged in order to support Simoncelli's bid for the papacy in the second conclave of 1590.

References

External links
http://www.diocesituscolana.it/cronologia/resfrascati.asp?idx=gs1600

1522 births
1605 deaths
16th-century Italian cardinals
Cardinal-nephews
People from Orvieto
17th-century Italian cardinals